Lee Da-in is a Korean name consisting of the family name Lee and the given name Da-in, and may also refer to:

 Lee Da-in (actress, born 1985) (born 1985), South Korean actress
 Lee Da-in (actress, born 1992) (born 1992), South Korean actress